Shannondale is an unincorporated community in northern Shannon County, in the Ozarks of southern Missouri, United States. The community is located on Missouri Route 19, north of Timber.

Shannondale was platted in 1874 by Charles Shannon, and named after him.

References

Unincorporated communities in Shannon County, Missouri
Unincorporated communities in Missouri